MNP Community & Sport Centre, formerly known as the Repsol Sport Centre, Talisman Centre and Lindsay Park Sports Centre, is a multi-sports complex in Calgary, Alberta, Canada. The name of the facility was changed in March 2002, after the City of Calgary sold the naming rights for 10 million dollars to Talisman Energy for 20 years, which was later bought out by Repsol and resulted in another name change. Upon Repsol's naming sponsorship agreement expired in Spring of 2022, MNP LLP obtained the naming rights to the building, resulting in its current name.

MNP Community & Sport Centre operates under a dual mandate as directed by The City of Calgary to support both Members and Sport Partner Athletes: 
To provide training and competition facilities and services for the development of Calgary's high performance athletes in their respective dryland and aquatic sports.
To provide facilities, programs and services for the wellness and recreational sporting needs of the citizens of Calgary.

The complex attracts over 1.8 million visitors annually.

The complex itself is run by the non-profit Lindsay Park Sports Society, a 13-member board and Civic Partner of the City of Calgary.

Original structure 

The structure itself was built in 1983 for the Western Canada Summer Games. The white inverted v-shaped roof, comprises a steel arch spine with a concrete perimeter. The skin of the roof is a Teflon-coated fibreglass outer skin, that achieves 4% transparency reducing the need for artificial light.
The original project cost was $24.7 million. The original facility was opened as  area.

The facility was built at the same time as the Scotiabank Saddledome which is just across Macleod Trail. The project site (between the neighbourhood of Mission and Erlton) was chosen because of easy access to the C-Train that began operation in 1981, and access to the Elbow River pathway.

Major Expansion in 2003-2004 
In 2004 Talisman Centre completed a $24 million expansion. The new Fitness Centre is named, Dr. Neville Lindsay Sport Wellness Centre, to commemorate and honour Calgary's first doctor and legendary pioneer who owned the land upon which the facility sits. The new Aquatic Centre is named, The Calgary Foundation Aquaplex, to recognize and celebrate the contributions of The Calgary Foundation through a major gift from an anonymous donor.

The facility holds sporting events both professional and amateur, and all facilities are open to the public. Repsol Sport Centre hosts many regional, national and international competitions in water polo, synchronized swimming, swimming, diving, track, basketball and other sports.

On-going expansions 
The Talisman Centre has had a few controversies over the years. One was surveillance cameras in sensitive areas, such as change rooms. The presence of cameras throughout the facility was included in the privacy policy. The complex also came under fire when the naming rights were sold to Talisman Energy, some lobby groups claim the oil company is responsible for funding atrocities in Sudan when it primarily did business in the country. These controversies never made an impact on attendance or operations.

Other nearby sports facilities in the area are the Stampede Corral, Scotiabank Saddledome, Stampede Grandstand, and Shaw Millennium Park.

2013-2014 Facility Improvements 
On June 20, 2013, Talisman Centre was forced to evacuate and close the entire facility as one of the worst natural disasters in Alberta's history, the June Flood, hits Calgary.

The flood caused close to $10 million in damages including restoration, repairs and, in most cases, brand new equipment was brought in to replace flood-infected air ducts, and beyond-repair mechanical machinery and electrical equipment.  As well, administrative files and other program gear was damaged along with numerous fitness machines broken down from the lack of air flow during the closure.  Talisman Centre is continuing to work with The City of Calgary and its insurance company to replace all items, with new fitness and cardio equipment arriving by the end of the year.

New lower level activity spaces include:  Multi-Sport 1 Studio, Multi-Sport 2 Studio, and Strength & Balance (Yoga & Pilates) Studio.

Roof Replacement 
The original tensile roof on the Repsol Sport Centre was constructed in 1983 and remained in service longer than anticipated.  After a two-year review regarding options for the existing roof, City Council approved funding for a new-and-improved roof system.  While maintaining the original roof's profile, the new roof system made use of new materials such as Nanogel aerogel thus providing better insulation and energy efficiency while also allowing a significant amount of light to filter into the building's interior.  
2010 – In March, the tented portion of the facility is closed for the replacement of its roof and many facility upgrades. The $44.5 million project was a joint initiative between The City of Calgary, The Government of Canada and Talisman Energy. The new roof was completed in 2011 and is expected to last 30-plus years.

References

External links

MNP Community & Sport Centre home page

Sports venues in Calgary
s